65537 is the integer after 65536 and before 65538.

In mathematics

65537 is the largest known prime number of the form . Therefore, a regular polygon with 65537 sides is constructible with compass and unmarked straightedge. Johann Gustav Hermes gave the first explicit construction of this polygon. In number
theory, primes of this form are known as Fermat primes, named after the mathematician
Pierre de Fermat. The only known prime Fermat numbers are

In 1732, Leonhard Euler found that the next Fermat number is composite:

In 1880,  showed that

65537 is also the 17th Jacobsthal–Lucas number, and currently the largest known integer n for which the number  is a probable prime.

Applications
65537 is commonly used as a public exponent in the RSA cryptosystem. This value was used in RSA mainly for historical reasons; early raw RSA implementations (without proper padding) were vulnerable to very small exponents, while use of high exponents was computationally expensive with no advantage to security (assuming proper padding).

65537 is also used as the modulus in some Lehmer random number generators, such as the one used by ZX Spectrum, which ensures that any seed value will be coprime to it (vital to ensure the maximum period) while also allowing efficient reduction by the modulus using a bit shift and subtract.

References

Integers